Sheikh Fazle Noor Taposh (born 19 November 1971) is a Bangladeshi politician and current Mayor of South Dhaka. He previously served as a Member of the Jatiya Sangsad for Dhaka-10 and Dhaka-12 from the Bangladesh Awami League.

Early life
Taposh was born to Awami League leader Sheikh Fazlul Haque Mani and Arzu Moni. His parents were both assassinated on 15 August 1975 in a military coup that also killed Sheikh Mujibur Rahman and other members of his family. Taposh and his elder brother Sheikh Fazle Shams Parash survived.

Career
Taposh was elected to the Jatiya Sangsad in Bangladesh General Election, 2008 from the Dhaka-12 constituency.

Taposh vehicle came under bomb attack on 21 October 2009. There was property damage and 13 people were injured in the attack.

In the 2014 general election he was elected unopposed to represent the Dhaka-10 constituency.

In 2015 there was a bomb attack on his rally.

In 2018 election he has been elected as member of parliament for consecutive third time.

In 2020, he won the Dhaka Mayoral Election and became the mayor of Dhaka South. He gets status of Full minister from 8 August 2022 along with DNCC Mayor Atiqul Islam.

Policies
Taposh called for the trial of Mahfuz Anam for supporting the military backed caretaker government. He has criticized Rapid Action Battalion over extra judicial killings.

References
11.

“DSCC to relocate stray dogs”. Dhaka          Tribune. Retrieved 2 September 2020.

1971 births
Living people
Sheikh Mujibur Rahman family
Awami League politicians
10th Jatiya Sangsad members
11th Jatiya Sangsad members
Place of birth missing (living people)